Dahi machha is a traditional Odia delicacy made of fish in a spicy yogurt based sauce. It is eaten usually served with rice as an accompaniment. Dahi Machha Jhola is liberally seasoned with turmeric, onions, garlic, mustard and garam masala. The use of turmeric imparts a yellow colour to the sauce base. Before being served, chopped fresh cilantro may be sprinkled on top for added flavour as well as enhanced appearance.

The kinds of fish that typically used in Oriya households are ilish (called ilisi), rohu (called rohi), and catla (called bhakura). Apart from these, there are some very famous small sized fish that are normally favoured over others.

Ingredients
Fish, dahi, potatoes, mustard, turmeric, garlic, chilli peppers, other seasonings.

See also
 Machher jhol
 Chingudi jhola
 Chhencheda
 Odia cuisine

External links
 

Odia cuisine
Indian fish dishes
Yogurt-based dishes